The Creston Clippers were a junior 'B' ice hockey team based in Creston, British Columbia, Canada. They were members of the Eastern Division of the Kootenay International Junior Hockey League (KIJHL).

The Clippers joined the league in 1976 as an expansion team and folded in 1985. They won one division title as a member of the Eastern Division from 1976-1985.

History

After the Clippers folded in 1985, the Creston Thunder joined the Rocky Mountain Junior Hockey League (RMJHL) as a junior 'A' team as an expansion team in 1992, but by the 1998-99 season, the RMJHL had fallen to four teams and was playing a lot of interleague with the America West Hockey League. The Creston Thunder could not afford the travel and opted to leave the RMJHL, effectively forcing the league to fold, at the end of the 1999 playoffs. The team sat out for the 1999-00 season to reorganize. Prior to the 2000-01 season, the team was renamed the Creston Valley Thunder Cats and joined the Kootenay International Junior Hockey League, as a junior 'B' team.

Season-by-season record

Note: GP = Games played, W = Wins, L = Losses, T = Ties, OTL = Overtime Losses, Pts = Points, GF = Goals for, GA = Goals against

Notable alumni
Jamie Huscroft

Ice hockey teams in British Columbia
1976 establishments in British Columbia
1985 disestablishments in British Columbia
Ice hockey clubs established in 1976
Sports clubs disestablished in 1985